A  or  is a type of education system in ancient India with  ('students' or 'disciples') living near or with the guru, in the same house. tradition by contrast, the word Guru has a very restricted use and not generally applied to individual teachers, while the institution of Gurdwara has a major social role instead of a monastic one.) The term is also used today to refer to residential monasteries or schools operated by modern gurus.

The students learn from the guru and help the guru in his everyday life, including carrying out of mundane daily household chores. However, some scholars suggest that the activities are not mundane and very essential part of the education to inculcate self-discipline among students. Typically, a guru does not receive or accept any fees from the  studying with him as the relationship between a guru and the shishya is considered very sacred.

At the end of one's education, a  offers the guru  before leaving the gurukul. The  is a traditional gesture of acknowledgment, respect and thanks to the guru, which may be monetary, but may also be a special task the teacher wants the student to accomplish.
Through Gurukul, students used to learn self discipline, politeness, good humanism and spirituality that would assist them to be an enlightened person in the future.

History 

The  system of education has been in existence since ancient times. The Upanishads (1000-800 BCE) mention multiple , including that of guru Drona at Gurgaon. The  (a discourse on the Brahman) is said to have taken place in Guru Varuni's . From initiation until the age of 25 all individuals are prescribed to be students and to remain unmarried, a celibate.

 were supported by public donations. This was followed by the many following Vedic thoughts making gurukul one of the earliest forms of public school centres.

Revival of the  system 

By the colonial era, the  system was on a steep decline in India. Dayananda Saraswati, the founder of Arya Samaj and Swami Shraddhanand, were the pioneers of the modern  system, who in 1886 founded now-widespread Dayanand Anglo-Vedic Public Schools and Universities.

In 1948, Shastriji Maharaj Shree Dharamjivan das Swami followed suit and initiated first Swaminarayan  in Rajkot in Gujarat state of India. Recently, several  have opened up in India as well as overseas with a desire to uphold tradition.

Various  still exist in India, and researchers have been studying the effectiveness of the system through those institutions. With the advent of new means of mass communication, many gurus and Vedantic scholars are opening E-gurukul. These gurukuls are operating online and are now imparting knowledge about different Hindu scriptures using the internet.

In 1990, Shrii Shrii Anandamurtiji founded Ananda Marga gurukul with its headquarters at Anandanagar, Dist Purulia, West Bengal, India and its branches all over the globe. {www.gurukul.edu} He nominated Acharya Shambhushivananda Avadhuta as its kulapati (chancellor) and formed a skeletal structure for spreading "neohumanist education" all over the globe.

Scholarly works on Gurukul 

 Dharampal a Gandhiain Scholar authored a book titled The beautiful tree: Indigenous Indian education in the eighteenth century
 Prof. Marmar Mukhopadhayay compiled a book titled Total Quality Management in Education deriving insights from ancient education system. He also devised concept of Multi-Channel Learning based on Gurukul Pedagogy.
 Ankur Joshi authored a research papers titled - Elementary education in Bharat (that is India): insights from a postcolonial ethnographic study of a Gurukul, A post-colonial perspective towards education in Bharat, and Delivering holistic education for contemporary times: Banasthali Vidyapith and the Gurukula system.

Out of India 
The gurukulam system of education is available outside of India as well.  
They are known as gurukul.

In Belgium 
At the Jain Culture Center of Antwerp, children between the ages of 8 till 16 study Vedic mathematics, Art, Music, as well as Vedic Astrology, Jyotishi, Sanskrit and Yoga.

Children participate in this gurukul during holiday times at the traditional schools, for a week in October / November, 2 weeks during Easter break, and 1 month during summer break.

See also
 Acharyakulam
 Akhara
 Akshaya Patra Foundation
 Education in India
 Ekal Vidyalaya
 Gurukul Kangri Vishwavidyalaya
 History of education in the Indian subcontinent
 Swaminarayan Gurukul
 Uchi-deshi (a similar system in Japan)
 Vanavasi Kalyan Ashram
 Vidya Bharti
 Photography Gurukul

References

External links

 List of Gurukuls in India (State-wise)

School types
Hindu education
Vedic period